Karlapalem is a village in Bapatla district of the Indian state of Andhra Pradesh. It is the headquarters of Karlapalem mandal in Tenali revenue division.

Geography 

The irrigation water for the village and its surrounding areas is drawn from Prakasam Barrage reservoir, through the Kommamuru and Poondla channels of Krishna Western Delta system.

Governance 

Karlapalem gram panchayat is the local self-government of the village. It is divided into wards and each ward is represented by a ward member.

Education 

As per the school information report for the academic year 2018–19, the village has 28 schools. These include 10 private and 18 Zilla/Mandal Parishad schools.

See also 

List of villages in Guntur district

References 

Villages in Guntur district
Mandal headquarters in Guntur district